William Gosling (born 1932) is a British electrical engineer, Emeritus Professor of Electrical Engineering at the University of Bath, and pioneer of system design in electrical engineering.

Biography 
Gosling received his ARCS at the Imperial College in London in 1953 under George Paget Thomson, and spent his career both in industry and education. Early 1960s he wrote a series of books, which contributed to the establishment of systems design and systems engineering.

In 1967 Gosling became Professor of Electrical Engineering at the Swansea University. From 1969 to 1971 he was Chair of the Design Research Society. In 1974 he became Professor of Electronic Engineering at the University of Bath., where he remained affiliated for the rest of his career. In the 1970s he also became Technical Director of Plessey, a British-based international electronics, defence and telecommunications company. Here he managed a division with over fifteen hundred scientists and engineers.

In 1978 he was elected President of EUREL (Convention of National Societies of Electrical Engineers in Western Europe). The next year as president of the Institution of Electronic and Radio Engineers he helped to merge the society into the Institution of Electrical Engineers.

Publications 
Gosling wrote about eleven books and over fifty scientific papers. A selection:
 1962. The design of engineering systems. New York, Wiley
 1964. Field effect transistor applications. New York, Wiley
 1965. Mechanical system design. With Wolfgang Ernst Eder
 1967. The genesis of electrical engineering: Inaugural Lecture Delivered at the College on 24th January, 1967. University College of Swansea
 1968. An introduction to microelectronic systems. New York, McGraw-Hill
 1978. Microcircuits, Society and Education
 1999. Radio Antennas and Propagation, 1st Edition': Radio Engineering Fundamentals
 2020. Culture’s Engine. London, Palgrave Macmillan

References

External links 
 William Gosling at marchofinvention

1932 births
Living people
British electrical engineers
Academics of the University of Bath
Academics of Swansea University
Alumni of Imperial College London
Systems engineers